The 2014 National Club Baseball Association (NCBA) Division II World Series was held at Brooks Stadium in Paducah, Kentucky, US from May 16 to May 20. The seventh tournament's champion was the Texas A&M Corps of Cadets.

Format
The format is similar to the NCAA College World Series in that eight teams participate in two four-team double elimination brackets. There are a few differences between the NCAA and the NCBA format. One of which is that the losers of Games 1-4 move to the other half of the bracket. Another difference is that the NCBA plays a winner take all for its national title game while the NCAA has a best-of-3 format to determine its national champion. Another difference which is between NCBA Division I and II is that Division II games are 7 innings while Division I games are 9 innings.

Participants

† denotes school also fields an NCBA Division I team

Results

Bracket

* denotes extra inning game

Game Results

Championship Game

See also
2014 NCBA Division I Tournament
2014 NCBA Division I World Series
2014 NCBA Division II Tournament

Notes
The 12 inning game between Akron and the Texas A&M Corps of Cadets was the longest Division II World Series game in NCBA history in terms of innings played. This had shattered the previous mark of 9 innings, which was set on three occasions (2008 Kentucky/Wyoming, 2012 Kennesaw State/Maryland and 2012 Penn State/Wyoming).
Texas A&M Corps of Cadets became the first team since Kentucky in 2009 to win the NCBA Division II World Series after losing their first game of the tournament.

References

Baseball in Kentucky
2014 in baseball
National Club Baseball Association